The 1946 VMI Keydets football team was an American football team that represented the Virginia Military Institute (VMI) during the 1946 college football season as a member of the Southern Conference (SoCon). In their tenth year under head coach Pooley Hubert, the team compiled a  4–5–1 record (3–3–1 against SoCon opponents) and was outscored by a total of 203 to 133.

Schedule

References

VMI
VMI Keydets football seasons
VMI Keydets football